Bibi van der Zee (born 1970s, London) is a political activist and journalist.

Van der Zee is the daughter of the Dutch journalist and author Henri van der Zee (1935–2013) and the British journalist Barbara Griggs. She is a regular columnist for New Statesman and The Guardian.

Bibliography
Green Business: Sustainability, Resources, People, Planet, Profit (Essential Managers) (2008)
Rebel, Rebel: The Protestor's Handbook (2008)
The Protestor's Handbook (2010)

References

1970s births
Year of birth missing (living people)
Living people
British journalists
Journalists from London
British people of Dutch descent